Evangelical Council may refer to:

 Evangelical Council for Financial Accountability, American church financial standards authority
 Evangelical Council of Venezuela
 Philippine Council of Evangelical Churches
 Church of England Evangelical Council

See also 

 Evangelical counsels, the virtues of poverty, chastity, and obedience
 Ecumenical council